Junior Gustavo Izaguirre Puerto (born 12 August 1979) is a Honduran retired football defender, who most recently played for F.C. Motagua in the Honduran Liga Nacional.

Club career
Izaguirre started his professional career at Honduran giants F.C. Motagua with whom he stayed for 8 years. He was the hero of the 2001 Apertura championship final when he scored all three of Motagua's goals against  Marathón. In 2005, he moved abroad only for an unsuccessful campaign at Uruguayan top team Peñarol, due to an injury. He only played one match for them before his contract was terminated in April 2006. He returned to Honduras to have a short spell at Marathón, then signed for Victoria.  He returned to his first club, F.C. Motagua, before the 2011 Clausura championship.

He is the top-scoring defender of Honduran football with 37 goals.

International career
Izaguirre played at the 1999 FIFA World Youth Championship and was a member of the national squad at the 2000 Summer Olympics in Sydney. Izaguirre then won many caps for the Honduras national football team around the start of the 21st century, playing regularly in central defense.

He made his international debut against Canada on May 30, 2000, and received his final cap against Nicaragua on February 15, 2007. The high point of Izaguirre's international career came in the consolation match of the 2001 Copa América against Uruguay, when he scored in regulation time and hit the decisive penalty in the shootout to secure third-place honors for Honduras. He has represented his country in 2 FIFA World Cup qualification matches and played at the 2001 and 2007 UNCAF Nations Cups as well as at the 2005 CONCACAF Gold Cup.

International goals
Scores and results list Honduras' goal tally first.

References

External links

 Profile - Diez 

1979 births
Living people
Sportspeople from Tegucigalpa
Association football defenders
Honduran footballers
Honduras international footballers
Olympic footballers of Honduras
Footballers at the 2000 Summer Olympics
2001 UNCAF Nations Cup players
2001 Copa América players
2005 CONCACAF Gold Cup players
2007 UNCAF Nations Cup players
F.C. Motagua players
Peñarol players
C.D. Marathón players
C.D. Victoria players
Honduran expatriate footballers
Expatriate footballers in Uruguay
Liga Nacional de Fútbol Profesional de Honduras players
Uruguayan Primera División players
Pan American Games silver medalists for Honduras
Footballers at the 1999 Pan American Games
Medalists at the 1999 Pan American Games
Pan American Games medalists in football